is a private university in Nasushiobara, Tochigi, Japan, established in 1999. The present name was adopted in 2006. Utsunomiya Junior College is attached to this university. The college is currently closed. It has tennis courts, a gym, a baseball field, and a small cafe.

External links
 Official website 

Educational institutions established in 1999
Private universities and colleges in Japan
Universities and colleges in Tochigi Prefecture
1999 establishments in Japan
Nasushiobara